Dunneville is an unincorporated community in San Benito County, California, United States.

References

Unincorporated communities in California
Unincorporated communities in San Benito County, California